Our Lady of the Good Shepherd is a title which refers to Mary, mother of Jesus, in connection with Jesus's role as the "Good Shepherd". This title and its variants may refer to:

 Congregation of Our Lady of Charity of the Good Shepherd, a French religious order
 Our Lady of the Good Shepherd Cathedral, Djibouti
 Feast of Our Lady Mother of the Good Shepherd, a feast day locally celebrated on or near the Third Sunday of Easter
 Parish Church of Our Lady of the Divine Shepherd, a church in Brazil

See also 
 Divine Shepherdess (disambiguation)